Abby Ryder Fortson (born March 14, 2008) is an American actress who played Ella Novak in Transparent, Harper Weil in The Whispers, Sophie Pierson in Togetherness and Cassie Lang in Ant-Man (2015) and Ant-Man and the Wasp (2018).

She is the daughter of actress Christie Lynn Smith and her husband, John Fortson.

Filmography

Film

Television

References

External links

2008 births
Living people
21st-century American actresses
American film actresses
American television actresses
American child actresses
American voice actresses
Actresses from Burbank, California